Miss Tunisie is a national Beauty pageant in Tunisia. The pageant produced titleholders of Tunisia at Miss Universe, Miss World, Miss International and Miss Earth pageants.

History

Miss Tunisie was held for first time in 1956. The pageant became the national franchise of Miss World in 1956–present, Miss Universe in 1960 - 1971, and Miss International in 1960–present. In 1996, President of Association TEJ - Aida Antar revived the defunct Miss Tunisie contest and is now the official trademark owner.

In 2013, Association TEJ declared to return at Miss World pageant for the first time since 1978. The pageant was held in Jakarta, Indonesia where for the first time the pageant did not allow the bikini session for only that year.

Titleholders

Titleholders under Miss Tunisia Organization

Miss Universe Tunisia

Miss Tunisia winner was usually competing at Miss Universe until 1971.

Miss World Tunisia

Miss International Tunisia

Miss International Tunisia is usually appointed by the winner or one of the runner-ups in Miss Tunisia pageant.

Miss Earth Tunisia

Starting in 2022, the title Miss Earth Tunisia is awarded to one of the runner-ups in the Miss Tunisia pageant. In 2022, Imen Mehrzi was selected Miss Earth Tunisia.

See also

List of beauty contests

References

External links
Official website

 

 

Recurring events established in 1956
Tunisian awards
Events in Tunisia
1956 establishments in Tunisia
Tunisia
Tunisia
Tunisia
Tunisia
Women in Tunisia